Nils Johannes (Juho-Niillas) Jernsletten (14 September 1934; Tana, Norway – 20 May 2012) was a professor of Sámi at University of Tromsø, and editor of Sámi newspaper Ságat (1964-1966.) In 2005, he was made a Commander of the Royal Norwegian Order of St Olav was conferred upon him. His article, Joik and Communication, published in 1977, argues that joiking is a form of communication that is best understood as representing a particular milieu, which cannot be adequately communicated through recording or when performed on stage. This criticism, along with commercial factors, partially led to the end of the joik renaissance of the 1970s in Sami-populated areas in Scandinavia.

Bibliography
 Jernsletten, Nils 1969: Utkast til samisk ordliste for 1.-3. klasse. Oslo : Folkeskolerådet, 1969.
 Jernsletten, Nils 1974: Hállangiella : en undersøkelse av prosodiske faktorer i samisk i Tana. Avhandling (Magistergrad) - Universitetet i Oslo, 1974.
 Jernsletten, Nils 1980: Davvisámi suopmanat : davvisámegiela ja divttasvuonasámegiela suopmanteavsttat ja suopmankárttat / Nils Jernsletten.[Romssa] : Romssa universitehta. Sámegiela ossodat, ISL,
 Jernsletten, Nils 1983: Álgosátnegirji : samisk-norsk ordbok / Nils Jernsletten. Oslo : Universitetsforlaget, c1983.
 Jernsletten, Nils 1984: Intonation as a distinctive factor in Saami. Riepmočála. Oslo: Novus.

In other works
 Gaup Eira, Inger Marie; Johanna Ijäs ja Ole Henrik Magga. 2004: Juho-Niillasa 70-jagi beaivái. Sámi dieđalas áigecála ; nr 1/2004

References

See also
Sami Church Council (Church of Norway)

1934 births
2012 deaths
People from Tana, Norway
Linguists from Norway
Linguists of Sámi
Norwegian Sámi people
Academic staff of the University of Tromsø
Norwegian Sámi academics